The 2020–21 Biathlon IBU Cup was a multi-race tournament over a season of biathlon, organised by the International Biathlon Union. IBU Cup was the second-rank competition in biathlon after the Biathlon World Cup. The season started on 14 January 2021 in Arber, Germany and ended on 14 March 2021 in Obertilliach, Austria. The defending overall champions from the 2019–20 Biathlon IBU Cup were Lucas Fratzscher from Germany and Elisabeth Högberg from Sweden.

Calendar
Below is the IBU Cup calendar for the 2020–21 season.

Notes
 All European Championships races included in the IBU Cup total score.
 On 11 September, the rounds originally scheduled at Idre, Sweden, Sjusjøen, Norway and Martell-Val Martello, Italy were cancelled.

IBU Cup podiums

Men

Women

Men's team – 4x7.5 km Relay

Women's team – 4x6 km Relay

Mixed

Standings (men)

Overall 

 Final standings after 15 races.

Under 25 

 Final standings after 15 races.

Nation 

Final standings after 20 races.

Standings (women)

Overall 

 Final standings after all races.

Under 25 

 Final standings after all races.

Nation 

Final standings after 20 races.

Medal table

References

External links
IBU official site

IBU Cup
2021 in biathlon